Jason Chan (born April 12, 1991), better known as Amaz, is a Chinese-Canadian professional video game player best known for streaming Hearthstone on Twitch. Chan now plays for NRG, having left the Hearthstone team he created, Team Archon. He was Team Liquid's first Hearthstone streamer as well as a commentator for the Hearthstone World Championship.

Early life
Chan was born in Hong Kong on April 12, 1991. He later moved to Vancouver with his mother when he was in fourth grade, leaving his father behind. There he quickly learned English in his English as a second language (ESL) classes and was introduced to computer games by his cousin. After playing Warcraft III and World of Warcraft, he became a self-described "Blizzard fanboy".

During high school, Chan and his mother moved back to Hong Kong to live with his father. He had to attend international school due to losing most of his Chinese language knowledge during his time in Canada. He later attended University of Waterloo where he studied mathematics. In 2011, his mother died from intestinal cancer, after which he put his studies on hold to move back with his family.

Career
In 2013, Chan started an office job his uncle introduced him to in Hong Kong. After deeming it "boring," he earned his diploma and soon after tutored children in saxophone. He also worked on the board game Scribe's Arena, which he conceptualized in high school.

Chan started to stream on Twitch in late 2013 after a friend suggested him to. He considers himself lucky to have queued many of his games into fellow Hearthstone streamer, Artosis. This drew Chan a high of 20,000 concurring viewers.

Hearthstone
Chan was the first member of Team Liquid's Hearthstone division. In the Blizzard 2014 Stream Awards, Chan won the "Best Hearthstone Streamer in 2014" award in the poll categories. He came in second place for "Most Active Chat" and fifth place for "Highest Mean Viewership" for overall Blizzard games on Twitch. In November 2014, Chan formed Team Archon after leaving Team Liquid. He immediately signed the Blizzcon 2014 November Hearthstone world champion James "Firebat" Kostesich.

Amaz commentated the 2015 Hearthstone World Championship along with his colleagues Kripparrian and Frodan.

Chan voice acted some of the Blackrock Mountain expansion cards for Hearthstone'''s Cantonese and Taiwanese languages.

On September 6, 2016, Amaz left Team Archon, which he created, and joined NRG eSports.

Amaz produced the Amaz Team League Championships (ATLC), later called "the most successful third-party tournament in Hearthstone." On October 31, 2016, Amaz started a Kickstarter for ATLC 2, but cancelled it after two weeks due to insufficient funding.

Magic: The Gathering
Other than Hearthstone, he is also an occasional player and streamer of Magic: The Gathering (and its digital counterparts Magic: The Gathering Online and Magic: The Gathering Arena).

In June 2016, he was given a special invitation by Wizards of the Coast to play in Pro Tour Kyoto 2017. A year later, he was again invited to Pro Tour Minneapolis 2018, also being invited playing an exhibition match celebrating the 25th Anniversary of the game. His team achieved a Top 32 finish in the main event. While he managed to get into the finals of the exhibition match, only losing to 2017 Hearthstone Global Games winning member Stanislav Cifka (who is also the winner of Pro Tour Seattle 2012)

After the two special invitations in 2017 and 2018, he had been actively participating on both paper and digital Magic events, including two Grand Prix top 8 finishes in the 2018–19 season (as of May 1, 2019).

Currently, he is sponsored by ChannelFireball as a regular streamer and video producer for Magic: The Gathering Arena.

 Tournament results 

Other games
Amaz was invited by tournament host Pokimane to "TFT Thursday", a Teamfight Tactics'' tournament held on July 4, 2019.

References

External links 

 
 

Living people
Canadian people of Hong Kong descent
Canadian people of Chinese descent
University of Waterloo alumni
Sportspeople from Vancouver
Hearthstone players
Canadian esports players
Hong Kong esports players
Hong Kong YouTubers
1991 births
Team Liquid players
NRG Esports players
Canadian YouTubers
Twitch (service) streamers
Hong Kong LGBT people
Canadian LGBT sportspeople
21st-century Canadian LGBT people